The Commissioner's Trophy was awarded annually by the International Hockey League to the head coach who was judged to have contributed the most to his team's success.

Winners

External links
 Commissioner's Trophy www.hockeydb.com

International Hockey League (1945–2001) trophies